1C or 1c may also refer to:
1C Company, Russian software company
1 Cup (unit)
California Proposition 1C (2009), a defeated California ballot proposition
Cent (currency)
1 cent euro coins
Penny (United States coin)
Penny (Irish decimal coin)
 expression of genome size
First Cambridge Catalogue of Radio Sources
measure of charge rate for an electric battery
National Highway 1C, an Indian highway

See also
C1 (disambiguation)